Neoptolemus II (died 297 BC) was king of Epirus from 302 BC until his death. He was the son of king Alexander I of Epirus and Cleopatra of Macedonia, his maternal grandparents were Philip II of Macedon and Olympias. His maternal uncles included Alexander the Great and Philip III of Macedon. His maternal aunts included Thessalonike and Cynane.

Neoptolemus came to the throne after the overthrow of his cousin Pyrrhus in 302 BC. However Pyrrhus returned five years later in 297 BC with the financial and military support of the Egyptian king Ptolemy I. After they initially agreed to rule together as co-kings, Neoptolemus was killed at the behest of Pyrrhus.

References

4th-century BC births
297 BC deaths
Ancient Epirotes
Rulers of Ancient Epirus
3rd-century BC rulers
4th-century BC rulers